Bryx is a genus of pipefishes.

Species
The currently recognized species in this genus are:
 Bryx analicarens (Duncker, 1915) (pink pipefish)
 Bryx dunckeri (Metzelaar, 1919) (pugnose pipefish)
 Bryx randalli (Herald, 1965)
 Bryx veleronis Herald, 1940

References

 
Marine fish genera